Alix is a Franco-Belgian comics series.

Alix may also refer to:

Places
 Alix, Alberta, Canada, a village
 Alix, Rhône, France, a commune
 Alix, Arkansas, United States, an unincorporated community

People
 Alix (given name), a unisex given name
 Alix (surname), a surname
 Alexandra of Denmark (1844–1925), nicknamed "Alix"
 Alexandra Feodorovna (Alix of Hesse) (1872–1918), empress consort of Nicholas II of Russia

See also
 Əlix, Azerbaijan, a village
 Alex (disambiguation)